“So Far Away” is a song written by Carole King, which appeared on her 1971 album Tapestry. The recording features James Taylor on acoustic guitar.

The lyrics express longing for a lover who is far away.  But Allmusic critic Bill Janovitz notes that while the lyrics start by focusing on the physical distance between the lovers, the lyrics use that as a jumping-off point to explore emotional distance between lovers as well.  Rolling Stone stated King's "warm, earnest singing" on the song brought out the song's sadness.  Cash Box said of it that "Carole weaves a magnificent ballad spun of soft, melodic phrasing and soothing piano accompaniment topped off with the superb Lou Adler production touch." In 2017, Paste ranked the song number four on their list of the 12 greatest Carole King songs, and in 2022, American Songwriter ranked the song number two on their list of the 10 greatest Carole King songs.

In addition to Taylor, and King on piano, instruments include Russ Kunkel on drums, Charles Larkey on bass guitar and Curtis Amy on flute.

Personnel
Carole King – piano, vocals

Additional musicians
Curtis Amy – flute
Russ Kunkel – drums
Charles "Charlie" Larkey – bass guitar
James Taylor – acoustic guitar

Notable covers
In 1995, Rod Stewart's cover of the song was included on the tribute album Tapestry Revisited: A Tribute to Carole King. In the US, it was released as a single and peaked at #2 on the AC chart. It reached #4 on the Canadian AC chart. "So Far Away" was later included on his 1996 ballad compilation album If We Fall in Love Tonight.

Chart history

Weekly charts
Carole King original

Rod Stewart cover

Year-end charts

References

External links
 [ Review] at Allmusic
 

1971 singles
Carole King songs
Songs written by Carole King
Song recordings produced by Lou Adler
Rod Stewart songs
Ode Records singles
1971 songs